Anchor Plaza is an office building located in Bucharest. Tenants include Adobe and Carrefour.

External links

Skyscraper office buildings in Bucharest

Office buildings completed in 2006